A water beetle is a generalized name for any beetle that is adapted to living in water at any point in its life cycle. Most water beetles can only live in fresh water, with a few marine species that live in the intertidal zone or littoral zone. There are approximately 2000 species of true water beetles native to lands throughout the world.

Many water beetles carry an air bubble, called the elytra cavity, underneath their abdomens, which provides an air supply, and prevents water from getting into the spiracles. Others have the surface of their exoskeleton modified to form a plastron, or "physical gill", which permits direct gas exchange with the water. Some families of water beetles have fringed hind legs adapted for swimming, but most do not. Most families of water beetles have larvae that are also aquatic; many have aquatic larvae and terrestrial adults.

Diet
Water beetles can be either herbivores, predators, or scavengers. Herbivorous beetles eat only aquatic vegetation, such as algae or leaves. They might also suck juices out the stem of a plant nearby. Scavenger beetles will feed on decomposing organic material that has been deposited. The scavenged material can come from aquatic vegetation, feces, or other small organisms that have died. The great diving beetle, a predator, feeds on things like worms, tadpoles, and even sometimes small fish.

Species
Families in which all species are aquatic in all life stages include: 
Dytiscidae 
Gyrinidae (Whirligig beetles)
Haliplidae 
Noteridae 
Amphizoidae
Hygrobiidae (Squeak beetles)
Meruidae
Hydroscaphidae (Skiff beetles). 

Families in which the adults are not necessarily aquatic include:
Hydrophilidae
Lutrochidae (Travertine beetles)
Dryopidae
Elmidae
Eulichadidae
Heteroceridae
Limnichidae
Psephenidae (Water-penny beetles)
Ptilodactylidae
Torridincolidae
Sphaeriusidae

See also 
 Aquatic insects

References 

 Epler, J. H. 1996. Identification manual for the water beetles of Florida (Coleoptera: Dryopidae, Dytiscidae, Elmidae, Gyrinidae, Haliplidae, Hydraenidae, Hydrophilidae, Noteridae, Psephenidae, Ptilodactylidae, Scirtidae). (PDF, 9.0 MB)

Beetles by adaptation
Aquatic insects
Insect common names